Harry Conway (1829 – 2 April 1905) was an Australian politician.

Conway was born in Ashby-de-la-Zouch in Leicestershire in 1829. In 1886 he was elected to the Tasmanian House of Assembly, representing the seat of George Town. He served until his defeat in 1893. He died in 1905 in Launceston.

References

1829 births
1905 deaths
Members of the Tasmanian House of Assembly